Bilston School of Art was built in 1897 on Mount Pleasant, Bilston to commemorate the Diamond Jubilee of Queen Victoria. It was designed by town engineer, Captain Wilson, who reputedly based the design very closely on an institution in Glasgow. The building falls within the Bilston Town Centre Conservation Area.

References

Art schools in England